Lupinus breweri is a species of lupine known by the common names Brewer's lupine and matted lupine. It is native to much of California, except for the deserts, and to adjacent sections of Oregon and Nevada, where it is common in some areas, particularly mountain forests. Quite short for a lupine, this is a hairy, mat-forming perennial herb, sometimes becoming like a shrub, with a woody base. The leaves spread out from the stem. The inflorescence is a dense raceme of flowers a few centimeters tall, each flower . The flower is blue or purple with a white or yellowish spot on the banner.

External links
Jepson Manual Treatment
Photo gallery

breweri
Flora of California
Flora of Nevada
Flora of Oregon
Flora without expected TNC conservation status